Woodville railway station is the junction station for the Grange and Outer Harbor lines with the lines diverging immediately north of the station. Situated in the western Adelaide suburb of Woodville, it is 7.5 kilometres from Adelaide station. It has auto pedestrian gates and lights. Platform 3 had a small kiosk, built around 2006, that sells refreshments and tickets, but has not been opened since 2009.

History

Woodville station was one of the original stations on the Adelaide to Port Adelaide railway, which opened in April 1856. The only other intermediate stations on the new line were at Bowden and Alberton. In the early days, Adelaide to Port Adelaide was a single-track railway and a passing loop was provided at Woodville. As traffic on the line increased, the single track was duplicated throughout in 1881.

The 1920s and 1930s saw significant development of heavy industry in Woodville and the neighbouring areas. For example, Holdens Motor Body Builders (later General Motors Holden) built a factory in the fork between the Grange and Outer Harbor lines. Sidings were laid to service the factory and Holdens station opened in 1928 a short way along the Grange line. Cars were dispatched by rail from Holdens' sidings.

The Woodville signal cabin became obsolete after a resignalling project in the late 1980s and has been relocated to the National Railway Museum, Port Adelaide. In late 2016, the station was ranked as one of the best stations in the western suburbs based on 5 criteria.

Grange Railway 

The railway line between Woodville and Grange opened in September 1882. It was a private railway, constructed by the Grange Railway and Investment Company. The early railway was not a financial success and was bought out by the South Australian Railways in 1893.

Branch lines
In World War II several munitions and armaments factories were opened, which resulted in construction of two new industrial branch lines in the Woodville area. The Finsbury line was opened in September 1940 and departed from the main line at Woodville. It headed in a northerly direction and serviced a wartime munitions works at Cheltenham Park and a Government Supply Depot at Finsbury. The line continued through Pennington to join the Dry Creek-Port Adelaide railway at Gillman Junction. The layout at Woodville station was altered in 1942 when a new platform face was constructed on the north-east side of today's Platform 3 to serve Finsbury trains. The original 1856 station building on the Port Adelaide-bound platform was demolished and a new signal cabin was provided adjacent to the Woodville Road level crossing.

This industrial line had limited passenger services, designed mainly to cater for workers at factories in the vicinity. After the end of World War II there were no off-peak trains, or weekend services after Saturday lunchtime. The Finsbury line closed on 17 August 1979 and later dismantled and redeveloped. The Islamic Arabic Centre & Al-Khalil Mosque on Torrens Road, Woodville North stands where the extensive Woodville North station platform used to stand until the 1980s.

Services by platform
For many years the Grange line was operated by a shuttle service train at weekends and in the evenings. This terminated at Platform 1 and made connections with Outer Harbor line trains to and from Adelaide. However, since about 1996, all Grange trains have operated through to Adelaide.

Transport links

|}

|}

References

External links

Railway stations in Adelaide
Railway stations in Australia opened in 1856